Eyyvah Eyvah 3 is a 2014 Turkish comedy film starring Ata Demirer and Demet Akbağ. It was directed by Hakan Algül and is the third installment in the Eyyvah Eyvah film series.

Cast
 Ata Demirer – Hüseyin Badem  
 Demet Akbağ – Firuzan  
 Özge Borak – Müjgan 
 Serra Yılmaz – Mercedes 
 Salih Kalyon – Halil 
 Tarık Ünlüoğlu – Edremit  
 Ayşe Nil Şamlıoğlu – Necla 
 Teoman Kumbaracıbaşı – İspanyol
 Beyti Engin – Kasap
 Cengiz Bozkurt  
 Şener Kökkaya 
 Tanju Tuncel
 Meray Ülgen
 Caner Alkaya 
 Şehsuvar Aktaş 
 Hazım Körmükçü
 Hande Dane
 Elif Erdoğan
 Özkan Çınarlı
 Murat Serezli
 Kahraman Sivri
 Selahattin Taşdöğen
 Yeşim Ceren Bozoğlu 
 Naci Taşdöğen
 Durul Bazan
 Erkan Can 
 Onur Buldu
 Onur Atilla
 Selçuk Borak 
 Ergün Kuyucu
 Cenk Tunalı

References

External links 
 
 

2014 films
Turkish comedy films
2010s Turkish-language films
Turkish sequel films
Films set in Turkey
2014 comedy films